The Valkyr Range is a subrange of the Selkirk Mountains of the Columbia Mountains in southeastern British Columbia, Canada, located on the east side of Lower Arrow Lake west of Nelson. "Valkyr" may be a reference to the "Valkyrie" of Norse mythology.

References

"Valkyr Range". Canadian Mountain Encyclopedia. Bivouac.com.

Selkirk Mountains